Time to first fix (TTFF) is a measure of the time required for a GPS navigation device to acquire satellite signals and navigation data, and calculate a position solution (called a fix).

Scenarios
The TTFF is commonly broken down into three more specific scenarios, as defined in the GPS equipment guide:

 Cold  factory
 The receiver is missing or has inaccurate estimates of its position, velocity, the time, or the visibility of any of the GPS satellites. As such, the receiver must systematically search for all possible satellites. After acquiring a satellite signal, the receiver can begin to obtain approximate information on all the other satellites, called the almanac. This almanac is transmitted repeatedly over 12.5 minutes. Almanac data can be received from any of the GPS satellites and is considered valid for up to 180 days.
 Warm  normal
 The receiver has estimates of the current time within 20 seconds, the current position within 100 kilometers, its velocity within 25 m/s, and it has valid almanac data. It must acquire each satellite signal and obtain that satellite's detailed orbital information, called ephemeris data. Each satellite broadcasts its ephemeris data every 30 seconds, considered valid for up to 4 hours.
 Hot  standby
 The receiver has valid time, position, almanac, and ephemeris data, enabling a rapid acquisition of satellite signals. The time required of a receiver in this state to calculate a position fix may also be termed time to subsequent fix (TTSF).

Many receivers can use as many as twelve channels simultaneously, allowing quicker fixes (especially in a cold case for the almanac download). Many cell phones reduce the time to first fix by using assisted GPS (A-GPS): they acquire almanac and ephemeris data over a fast network connection from the cell-phone operator rather than over the slow radio connection from the satellites.

The TTFFs for a cold start is typically between 2 and 4 minutes, a warm start is 45 seconds (or shorter), and a hot start is 22 seconds (or only a few seconds). In older hardware where satellite search is slower, a cold start may take more than the full 12.5 minutes.

See also
 Global Positioning System (GPS)
 GPS signals
 High-sensitivity GPS
 Satellite navigation solution

References

External links
 US Coast Guard, Navigation Center's NAVSTAR GPS User Equipment Introduction.

Global Positioning System
Satellite navigation